Balabac Island is the southernmost island of the Palawan province, and therefore the westernmost undisputed island in the Philippines, only about  north from Sabah, Malaysia, across the Balabac Strait.

Administratively, the island forms the main part of the municipality of Balabac and is divided into 14 barangays (the other six barangays of the municipality are on other nearby islands):

Balabac Island is home to various endemic species. It is the home of birds like the grey imperial pigeon (Ducula pickeringii), Philippine cockatoo (Cacatua haematuropygia), blue-headed racket-tail (Prioniturus platenae), and the Palawan hornbill (Anthracoceros marchei). The Philippine mouse-deer, a subspecies of the greater mouse-deer (Tragulus napu) can only be found in this island.

The Molbogs, a Muslim ethnolinguistic group, is concentrated in this island. Their livelihood includes farming, fishing and barter trading with the nearby Mapun and Sabah market centres.

References 
  Balabac Island (Important Birds Areas of Philippines)
 The Molbog

External links
 Balabac Island at OpenStreetMap

Islands of Palawan